Jayadharma Malla was the son of Jayasthiti Malla and the twelfth Malla king of Nepal.

Reign 
His reign co-existed with his brothers Jayajyotir Malla, and Jayakiti Malla in Bhadgaon, while Jayadharma Malla was the sole king of Patan and Kathmandu. He was succeeded by his brother Jayajyotir Malla as the sole ruler of Kathmandu valley after his death in 1408.

References

Citations

Bibliography 

 
 

Malla rulers of the Kathmandu Valley
1367 births
 1408 deaths
15th-century Nepalese people
14th-century Nepalese people